A high-power field (HPF), when used in relation to microscopy, references the field of view under the maximum magnification power of the objective being used.  Often, this represents a 400-fold magnification when referenced in scientific papers.

Area
Area per high-power field for some microscope types:
Olympus BX50, BX40 or BH2 or AO: 0.096 mm2
AO with 10x eyepiece: 0.12 mm2
Olympus with 10x eyepiece: 0.16 mm2
Nikon Eclipse E400 with 10x eyepiece and 40x objective: 0.25mm2
Leitz Ortholux: 0.27 mm2
Leitz Diaplan: 0.31 mm2

Examples of usage
The area provides a reference unit, for example in reference ranges for urine tests.

Used for grading of soft tissue tumors: Grading, usually on a scale of I to III, is based
on the degree of differentiation, the average number of
mitoses per high-power field, cellularity, pleomorphism,
and an estimate of the extent of necrosis (presumably a
reflection of rate of growth). Mitotic counts and necrosis
are the most important predictors.

The following grading is part of classification of breast cancer:

References

Microscopy